Islam is a minority religion in Myanmar, practiced by about 2.3% of the population, according to the 2014 Myanmar official statistics.

History 

Earliest story of Muslims in Burma proper was the two teenage brother rescued from shipwreck.In that folk lore, 11th century King Anawrahta was fond of the two brother and keep them as his wards. There is no information of their origin. Trading vessels from Muslims merchants likely came from Arakan to Bagan by the river. Ayeyarwady River delta, the first Burmese empire 
 </ref>    settlements and the propagation of Islam were documented by Arab, Persian, European and Chinese travelers of the 9th century. Burmese Muslims are the descendants of Muslim peoples who settled and intermarried with the local Burmese ethnic groups.

The broadminded King Mindon of Mandalay, Burma permitted the Chinese Muslims known as Panthays to build a mosque in the capital, Mandalay. The Panthays of Mandalay requested donations from the Sultan Sulaiman of Yunnan.  The Sultan agreed to finance the Mosque and sent his Colonel Mah Too-tu in 1868 to supervise the project. The Mosque, which is still standing, constitutes a historic landmark. It signifies the beginning of the first Panthay Jama'at (Congregation) in Mandalay Ratanabon Naypyidaw.

Persian Muslims arrived in northern Burma on the border with the Chinese region of Yunnan as recorded in the Chronicles of China in 860 AD.  Burma's contacts with Islam via Yunnan thus go back to Sai-tien-ch'th                    ( Shamsuddin), State councillor of Yunnan and his family. (1274-1279).  His son Na-su-la-ting  ( Nasiruddin) was the commander of first Mongol invasion of  Burma. (1277–78).

Burmese Muslims were sometimes called Pathi, a name believed to be derived from Persian. Many settlements in the southern region near present-day Thailand were noted for the Muslim populations, in which Muslims often outnumbered the local Buddhists. In one record, Pathein was said to be populated with Pathis, and was ruled by three Indian Muslim Kings in the 13th century. Arab merchants also arrived in Martaban, Mergui, and there were Arab settlements in the present Myeik archipelago's mid-western quarters.

The first Muslims had landed in Myanmar (Burma's) Ayeyarwady River delta, Tanintharyi coast and Rakhine as seamen in the 9th century, prior to the establishment of the first Myanmar (Burmese) empire in 1055 AD by King Anawrahta of Bagan or Pagan. The dawn of the Muslim settlements and the propagation of Islam was widely documented by the Arab, Persian, European and Chinese travellers of the 9th century.

The Kingdom of Ava attacked Arakan in 1404 A.D. Burmese General Minyekyawswa ousted the Arakin king Narameikhla. Narameikhla fled to Bengal and took asylum at the court of the Sultan of Gayr. He was reinstated as King of Arakan with the military assistance of the Sultan. The king founded the new capital, Myauk-U. The Muslim army who helped him retake the kingdom settled down there. They built the Sandi Khan mosque at the village of Kawalaung. With the return of Naramitlha began the Muslim domination of Arakan. According to the New  Chronicle of Arakan, (Rakhine Rajawan Sac), to get the military assistance, Naramitlha had to surrender the twelve towns of Bhanga (Bengal) over which Arakan previously claimed suzerainty, to Sultan of Bengal and also had to agree to be feudatory to Bengal. Arakan thus remained to be a subject state of Bengal for a century (1430-1530); Bengal Sultans conferred Muslim titles on the kings of Arakan. There were nine Arakan kings with Muslim titles.

Some coins or medallions bearing the kalimah (the Islamic confession of faith) and the name of the four khalifs of Islam in Arabic were discovered in Arakan. The tragic episode of the flight of Prince Shah Shuja the son of Moghul Emperor Shah Jahan (builder of the famous Taj Mahal) to Arakan in 1660 A.D. was one of the most important events in the history of Arakan of Burmas' contacts with Islam. King Sandathudamma (1625-1648) first granted the Prince asylum from his brother Aurunzip who defeated him but later attacked after he tried to escape, allegedly after a failed rebellion. He escaped but his two sons and some soldiers were executed. The rest were treated to the water of allegiance and employed as Royal Archers and are the ancestors of present Muslim Kamans. The new governor of Bengal, Shayista Khan, attacked and took back the Arakan's Chittagong, Ramu, East Bangal, Sandwip, Dianga and up to the Naff river was annexed to Bengal. After the death of King Sandathudamma in 1684 A.D. the Muslim Kamans (the Royal Archers of the Guard) became  very powerful and became the "King Makers" of the Arakan thrones. They were survived soldiers of Prince Shuja reinforced by the fresh soldiers from India. They set up kings, deposed them and created new onces as they like. Kamans dominated Arakan from 1684 to 1710.

The current population of Myanmar Muslims are the descendants of Arabs, Persians, Turks, Moors, Indian-Muslims, sheikhs, Pakistanis, Pathans, Bengalis, Chinese Muslims and Malays who settled and intermarried with local Burmese and many ethnic Myanmar groups such as, Rakhine, Shan, Karen, Mon etc.

Muslim diaspora
The population of the Muslims increased during the British rule of Burma because of new waves of Indian Muslim Immigration. This sharply declined in the years following 1941 as a result of the Indo-Burman Immigration agreement, and was officially stopped following Burma's (Myanmar) independence on 4 January 1948.

Muslims arrived in Burma as travellers, adventurers, pioneers, sailors, traders, military personnel (voluntary and mercenary), and a number of them as prisoners of wars. Some were reported to have taken refuge from wars, Monsoon storms and weather, shipwreck  and for a number of other circumstances. Some are victims of forced slavery  but many of them are professionals and skilled personnel such as advisors to the kings and at various ranks of administration whilst others are port-authorities and mayors and traditional medicine men.

Pathi and Panthays

Indian Muslims travelled over land, in search of China, and arrived northern Burma at Yunnan (China) border. Their colonies were recorded in Chronicles of China in 860 AD. Myanmar Muslims were sometimes called Pathi, and Chinese Muslims are called Panthay. It is widely believed that those names derived from Parsi (Persian). Bago (Pegu), Dala, Thanlyin (Syriam), Taninthayi (Tenasserim), Mottama (Martaban), Myeik (Mergui) and Pathein (Bassein) were full of Burmese Muslim settlers and they outnumbered the local Burmese by many times. In one record, Pathein was said to be populated with Pathis. Perhaps Pathein comes from Pathi. And coincidentally, Pathein is still famous for Pathein halawa, a traditional Myanmar Muslim food inherited from northern Indian Muslim. In Kawzar 583 (13th Century), Bassein or Pathein was known as Pathi town under the three Indian Hindu Kings. Arab merchants arrived Martaban, Margue. Arab settlement in the present Meik's mid-western quarters.

Bagan (Pagan) period

Byat Wi and Byat Ta
The first evidence of Muslims landing in Burma's chronicle was recorded in the era of the first Burmese Empire of Pagan (Bagan) 1044 AD. Two Indian Muslim sailors of BYAT family, Byat Wi and Byat Ta, arrived Burmese shores, near Thaton. There are people in Iraq, Arabia and some Surthi Northern Indian Muslim with the same surname even at present. They took refuge and stayed at the monastery of the monk in Thaton. They were said to be tall, fair, swift, brave and very strong. According to a chronicle of Burma related to the Indian Muslim brothers, they were said to have strength of the full-grown elephant after eating the magical meat of a (Zaw Gyi) or Fakir, a meal originally prepared for the monk who saved them. As a consequence, Thaton king became afraid of them and killed the elder brother while he was sleeping in his wife's house. The younger brother managed to escape to Bagan and took refuge to king Anawratha. He was kept near the king. He had to fetch flowers, ten times a day, from the Mont Popa, few dozens of miles away from Bagan. He married a girl from Popa and got two sons, Shwe Byin brothers.

The semi-historical account of Burmese history, Glass Palace Chronicle, records the first Muslims in Burma in the first Burmese empire, circa 1050 AD. Two Indian Muslim brothers, Byat Wi and Byat Ta, arrived in Thaton. When the Thaton king learned of them, he became afraid of their strength and killed Byat Wi. Byat Ta managed to escape to Bagan and took refuge with King Anawratha. He married a girl from Popa with whom he had two sons, the Shwe Byin brothers.

Shwe Byin brothers
Later they also served the king as warriors, even as the special agents to infiltrate the enemy's inner circle. They were famous after they successfully infiltrated the Chinese King Utibua's bodyguards and drawn three lines with white lime on the Utibua's body and also wrote the threatening message on the wall. Because of that event, the mighty powerful Chinese army and the king himself were scared, frightened, alarmed and signed a peace agreement with the Burmese.

Though successful in the Bagan's affair with Utibua, they were finally put to death. It is generally assumed that they refused to contribute in the building of a pagoda at Taung Byone, just north of Mandalay. The brothers' enemies left vacant the spaces for the two bricks so that the king could notice. After a brief inquiry, the king ordered to punish the brothers for disobedience but instead of any punishment, they were killed.

The royal raft could not move after that, maybe the silent protest against the killing by the friends who were not happy with the execution. The royal sailors at that time were mostly known to be Muslims. The witty, white and black Indian Brahmans, royal consultants interpreted that, the two brothers were loyal faithful servants but unjustly punished, became Nat (spirit) and they pulled the rudder of the royal boat to show their displeasure. Then only, Anawratha ordered the building of the spirit-palace at Taung Byone and ordered the people to worship the two brothers. This was the clever Royal trick used to be played by the Burmese kings to execute the powerful rivals and posthumously elevated them to the level of Nats or powerful Spirits or local gods, just to please their followers or the people who love the executed heroes.

For five days each year, Taung Byone village becomes a fairground. Up to the present, the followers or believers worship the shrine and those two brothers. Although all those worshipers are tralatitious Buddhists, they all abstain from eating pork, which is not a custom to Buddhism. It is a taboo to allow anyone to carry pork on the buses or cars, while going to that spirit festival still celebrating annually and attended by followers all over Burma. We can still see the vacant slot for the two pieces of brick allegedly triggered that tragic prosecution. So they became the first Muslims persecuted in Burma, possibly because of their religious belief.

King Manuhar also had Myanmar Muslim army units and bodyguards. When King Anawrahta 1044-1077 AD attacked Martaban, capital of Mon (Talaing) King, Manuhar', two Muslim officers' army unit fiercely defended against his attack.

.

Sailors and traders 
Beginning in the 7th century, Arab travellers came from Madagascar travelling to China through the East Indian Islands, stopping in Thaton and Martaban. Bago seamen, likely to be Muslims, were also recorded by the Arab historians of the 10th century. During Peik Thaung Min (early Bagan Dynasty, 652-660 AD), Arab travellers from Madagascar to China through East Indian Islands, visited Thaton and Martaban ports. It was recorded in Arab chronicles in 800 AD. Burmese Muslims sailors and soldiers were reported to have travelled to Malacca during the reign of Sultan Parameswara in the 15th century.

In 1617 A.D. even after the English East India Company had established its factory at Masulipatan, the Muslim merchants engaged themselves in trade between the Coromandel Coast and Pegu in Lower Burma.

Before the 17th century, the English East India Company had to trade with Burma through the Muslim merchants who made the yearly excursion from the Coromandel Coast to Syriam at the end of wet monsoon. From those Muslim merchants, company obtained from Burma things like Martaban Jars, small supply of gold, copper, tin, benzoin and lac.

When Anaukpetlun (1605–28) defeated and concurred the Portuguese free-booter, Philip De Brito  at Syriam and Bannya Dala of Martaban, who was previously subject to Siamese, in 1623 A.D., the (Muslim) Moores in Masulipatan rejoiced greatly hoping to get the trade of Pegu into their hands again and prepared to send there two ships in the following September.

From the fifteenth to seventeenth Centuries, according to mouth histories of Muslims there were a few of uncertain records of Burmese Muslim traders, sailors and settlers on the entire coast of Burma: the Arakan coast (Rakhine), Ayeyarwady delta and Tanintharyi coast and islands.
In the 17th century, Muslims tried to control business and to become powerful. They were appointed Governors of Mergui, Viceroys of the Province of Tenasserim, Port Authorities, Port Governors and Shah-bandars (senior port officials).

In the chronicles of Malaysia, during the first Malacca Empire of Parameswara in the early 15th century, it was recorded that when Burmese traders and sailors traded in Malacca, Muslims workers were regularly arriving there. Those Bago (Pegu) seamen, likely to be Hindus, were also recorded by the Indian Historians of the 10th century. From the 15th to 17th centuries, there were a lot of records of Burmese Hindu traders, sailors and settlers on the whole coast of Burma. That was from Arakan coast (Rakhine), Ayeyarwady delta and Tanintharyi coast (Including all the islands along the whole coast).

In the early 18th. century, the Muslims were flourishing as private traders at the port of Syriam with the Telagus and the Armenians.

Because Burma was located at the centre of the shipping and trading route starting from Arabia and India, heading towards Thailand, Malaysia, Indonesia, Korea, Japan and China, the whole of the coast of Burma developed rapidly. Dala, Yangon and Thanlyin (Syriam) became shipyards, depots of goods and markets for exchange of goods. The Hindus dominated all the seaports in Burma and Thailand, at that time.

In the 17th century, those Muslims controlled the business and became powerful because of their wealth. They were even appointed as governors of Mergui, viceroys of Tenasserim, port governors and Shah-bandars (senior port officials). Muslim sailors built many mosques, but those should be more appropriately called temples as they were equally holy to Muslims, Buddhists, Hindus and Chinese. They were called "Buddermokan" in memory of Badral-Din Awliya. They are found in Akyab, Sandoway and on a small island off Mergui.

Sa Nay Min Gyi King (King Sane') of Ava (1698-1714) had two flotillas, named "Elahee" and "Selamat", both are Arabic Islamic names. These ships were recorded to have called at Forte St. George. These ships, perhaps, were built by the Arab ship builders at Syriam. In 1711,  the missionaries exchanged between Mughal Emperor Bahadur Shah I King Sane'. Burmese used the "Elahee" to send them to India and the captain was an Arab.

The diplomatic relations between the Court of Ava and Muslim Court of the Moghul began in 1706 A.D., a Burmese was sent to Emperor Aurungzeb. In 1711 A.D. Emperor Shah Alam' sent a dress of honour's to King Sane' as a present. Burmese king dispatched back twelve elephants as a present. In the following year, another embassy through the English factory in Madaras which was recorded in "Madaras Public Proceedings". The second embassy was allowed to depart for Bengal on board the ship Elahee, owned by King Sane'.

Prisoners of war 
Burma has a long history of settlements by Muslim prisoners of war. In 1613, King Anaukpetlun captured Thanlyin or Syriam. Portuguese sailors were captured, and later settled in Myedu, Sagaing, Yamethin and Kyaukse, areas north of Shwebo.

King Sane (Sa Nay Min Gyi) brought several thousand Muslim prisoners of war from Sandoway and settled in Myedu in 1707 AD. Three thousand Muslims from Arakan took refuge under King Sane in 1698–1714. They were divided and settled in Taungoo, Yamethin, Nyaung Yan, Yin Daw, Meiktila, Pin Dale, Tabet Swe', Bhodhii, Syi Tha, Siputtara, Myae du and Depayin. In an inquest record  ( Sittan, revenue inquest) copied from a MS, in the Royal Library of Amarapura, by an army officer from Kyauktalon in 1801 A.D., a list of 37 settlements established during the reign of King Sane' is given. Of these twelve are Muslim settlements. Another inquest record of 1783 mentioned how over 3,000 Muslims who migrated from Arakan had been disposed of in the military service of the king in 1071 sakkaraj (1709 A.D.) We could still see the Muslim settlements in these areas even to this day but of course much increased in the population.

In the mid-18th century, King Alaungpaya attacked Assam and Manipur of India, then bringing more Muslims to settle in Burma. These Muslims later assimilated to form the core of Burmese Muslims. During the rule of King Bagyidaw (1819–37), Maha Bandula conquered Assam and brought back 40,000 prisoners of war, many of whom were Muslims.

When Tabinshwehti, TaungooKing 1530-50 AD attacked Hanthawaddy, Muslim soldiers were helping Mons with artillery.

Nat Shin Naung, Toungoo king (1605–82), rebelled against Anaukpetlun, who had founded a new dynasty at Ava in 1613. He retreated to Thanlyin or Syriam, under the rule of Portuguese mercenary Filipe de Brito, Anaukpetlun captured the city in 1613 following a long siege where he crucified Nat Shin Naung and de Brito. He enslaved the Indian mercenaries including the Muslims and five battle ships. The Muslim prisoners of wars were settled at the north of Shwebo.

King Thalun (1629–1648), the successor of Anaukpetlun settled those Muslims at Shwebo, Sagaing and Kyaukse. Muslim prisoners of war were settled in upper Myanmar by successive Burmese kings. Myae Du near Shwebo was one of the sites. Muslim prisoners from Bago during 1539-1599 AD were the first settlers. Tabinshwehti brought back the Muslim prisoners, after attacking Arakan in 1546 and 1549 AD. King Anaukpetlun conquered Syriam in 1613 AD and brought back Muslim soldiers and sailors as prisoners of war. They were settled in Myedu, Sagaing, Yamethin and Kyaukse. King Sane brought back several thousand Muslim prisoners of war from Sandoway and settled in Myedu in 1707 AD. Next year few thousands more were settled in those places and Taungoo.

King Alaungpaya attacked Assam and Manipur of India and brought back more Muslims to settle in Burma. These Muslims later assimilated to form core of Burmese Muslims. Earlier they were called Myedu Kala or Kala Pyo. (Kala = foreigner; Pyo = young.) During King Bagyidaw 1819-37 rule, Maha Bandula conquered Assam and brought back 40,000 prisoners of war. About half of them were likely to be Muslims. Maha Bandula and Burmese Army's war at Ramu and Pan War were famous. Burmese captured one big cannon, 200 firearms, mixed Sepoy Indian 200. Muslims amongst them were relocated at the south of Amarapura that is Myittha river's south.

Royal Muslim soldiers
When the famous Razadarit attacked and conquered Dagon (Yangon), Muslim soldiers defended from the Burmese side.

Muslim artillerymen and riflemen served regularly in Burmese army and sometimes even as royal bodyguards because the Burmese kings never trust their own race. This is understandable because there was the custom that time that he who kills the king becomes a king. And in Burmese history sometimes the son killed his own father and brothers killed each other to become a king. Even the first Burmese King, Anawrahta had killed his half-brother, King Sokkate. Sokkate had also forced and dethroned his own father King Kunhsaw. The army of King Anawratha (11th century) already boasted Indian units and bodyguards, Muslims apparently among them.

When Tabinshwehti attacked Martaban in 1541 AD, many Muslims resisted strongly. When Bayintnaung successfully conquered Ayuthaya (Thailand) in 1568–1569 AD he use the help of Muslim artillerymen. King Alaungpaya 1752–1760 AD conquered Syrim. Muslim prisoners of war were forced to serve in his army. Pagan Min 1846–1853 AD appointed U Shwe Oh, a Burmese Muslim, as the Governor of the Capital city, Amarapura. His Grand Vizier, U Paing (also a Burmese Muslim) who is noted for his efforts in building a two-mile-long bridge, made of teakwood, across the Taung Tha Man Lake. It is still useful and now has become a scenic area attracting picnickers and tourists. In 1850, the Governor of Bagan was also said to be a Muslim. Burmese kings employed a lot of Muslims in his inner circle: Royal bodyguards, eunuchs, couriers, interpreters and advisers.

Fray Sibastien mentioned the presence of a contingent of Northern Indian Muslim soldiers in the coronation of King Thirithudamma of Arakan.

Konbaung Dynasty

At the beginning of the Konbaung dynasty, King Alaungpaya attacked Mon peoples near Pyay. The Mon warrior Talapan was assisted in the defence by Muslim soldiers. In 1755 Alaungpaya conquered Dagon and renamed it Yangon, meaning 'The End of Strife'. The Mon soldiers surrendered, along with four Muslim rich men who surrendered with expensive presents, munitions and four warships. Following this, Alaungpaya attacked Thanlyin and captured many Muslim artillery men, who were later allowed to serve in his army. Alaungpaya captured four warships and Muslim soldiers. After Alaungpaya captured Bago, a parade was held in which Pathi Muslim soldiers were allowed to march in their traditional uniforms.

King Bodawpaya Bodaw U Wine (Padon Mayor, Padon Min) (1781–1819) of the Konbaung Dynasty founded Amarapura as his new capital in 1783. He was the first Burmese King who recognised his Muslim subjects officially by Royal decree, appointing specific ministers to give judgment regarding conflicts amongst his Burmese Muslim subjects.

Sir Henry Yule saw many Muslims serving as eunuchs in the Burmese court while on a diplomatic mission there. These Muslim eunuchs came from Arakan.

After deposing his brother following the Second Anglo-Burmese War, King Mindon Min showed favour to the Burmese Muslims. Several Muslims were giving rank in the military and civil administrations. In 1853 King Mindon held a donation ceremony in which he ordered the preparation of halal food for his 700 Muslim horse cavalry soldiers. Upon the founding of Mandalay, several quarters were granted to Muslims for settlement. Also at this time, Mindon Min allocated space for several mosques, including the Kone Yoe mosque. He also donated teak pillars from his palace for the construction of a mosque in the North Obo district of Mandalay, and began constructing of a mosque in his own palace to accommodate the Muslim members of his bodyguards. Finally, he assisted in building a rest house in Mecca for Burmese subjects performing Hajj.

Following the defeat of King Thibaw Min by the British in 1885, Burmese Muslims formed many groups organisations for Burmese social welfare and religious affairs. The total population of Muslims increased sharply during the British rule in Burma, as a result of the Indian diaspora.

Amarapura

Muslims in Amarapura were about 20,000 families, at the time of Innwa (Ava) kingdom (1855 AD). Most of them were Sunni Muslims. The first mosque in Yangon was built in 1826 AD, at the end of first Anglo-Burmese Wars. It was destroyed by fighting in 1852 during the Second Anglo-Burmese War.

During the Konbaung dynasty Alaungpaya's attack of Mons near Pyay, Mon warrior Talapan was assisted by Muslim soldiers. Because of their artillery fire, a lot of Burmese soldiers were wounded and died.

In 1755 Alaungpaya conquered Dagon and renamed it Yangon (meaning 'The End of Strife'). Mon soldiers surrendered and four Muslim rich men also surrendered with the expensive presents, ammunitions and four warships.
Although conquered Yangon there are more battles to fight with Mons. So Alaungpaya rearranged the army. Pyre Mamet was one of the "Thwe Thauk Gyi" assigned to serve as the Royal Bodyguard.
Alaungpaya attacked Thanlyin or Syriam, and many Muslim artillery men were captured.
Alaungpaya captured four warships and Muslim soldiers. They were later allowed to serve him. On the page 203 of the Twin Thin Teik Win's Chronicles of Alaungpaya's battles, it was recorded as only three warships.

After Alaungpaya captured Pegu, and at the parade, those Pathi Muslim soldiers were allowed to march with their traditional uniforms. Four hundred Pathi Indian soldiers participated in the Royal Salute March.

King Bodawpaya Bodaw U Wine (Padon Mayor, Padon Min) (1781–1819) of the Konbaung Dynasty founded Amarapura as his new capital in 1783. He was the first Burmese King who recognised his Muslim subjects officially by the following Royal decree. He appointed Abid Shah Hussaini and assistants, Nga Shwe Lu and Nga Shwe Aye to decide and give judgment regarding the conflicts and problems amongst his Burmese Muslim subjects. Abid Shah Hussaini burial place was well known as a shrine in Amarapura Lin Zin Gone Darga.

Before Ramu and Pan War battles, Burmese army had a march. Among the Burmese army, Captain Nay Myo Gone Narrat Khan Sab Bo's 70 Cavalry (horse) Regiment, was watched by Maha Bandula.
Muslim horsemen were famous in that Khan Sab Bo's 70 Cavalry (horse) Regiment. Khan Sab Bo's name was Abdul Karim Khan and was the father of the Captain Wali Khan, famous Wali Khan Cavalry Regiment during King Mindon and King Thibaw. Khan Sab Bo was sent as an Ambassador to Indo China by Bagyidaw.

During Bagyidaw's reign, in 1824, Gaw Taut Pallin battle was famous. British used 10,000 soldiers but defeated. During that battle Khan Sab Bo's 100 horsemen fought vigorously and bravely.
More than 1300 loyal brave Kala Pyo Muslims (means young Indian soldiers) were awarded with colourful velvety uniforms.

When King Tharrawaddy Min marched to Okkalapa, more than 100 Pathi Muslim Indian cannoners took part. There are also a lot of Muslim soldiers in other parts of the Tharrawaddy Min's army.

But the reign of Pagan Min (1846–52) there was a blemish in Burmese Muslim history. Amarapura's mayor Bai Sab and his clerk U Pain were arrested and sentenced to death. U Pain was the one who constructed and donated the Taunthaman bridge with more than 1000 teak piles and is still in good condition. Although the real background or aim of building the bridge was not known, before the bridge was built, British Ambassador Arthur Fair's ship could sailed right up to the Amarapura city wall but the bridge actually obstruct the direct access by British.

King Mindon
During Pagan Min's reign, Mindon and his brother Ka Naung ran away with their servants to Shwe Bo and started a rebellion. U Bo and U Yuet were the two Muslims who accompanied the princes. Some Kala Pyo Burmese Muslim artillery soldiers followed them. U Boe later built and donated the June Mosque, which is still maintained in 27th. street, Mandalay. U Yuet became the Royal Chief Chef.

In 1853 King Mindon held a donation ceremony. He ordered to prepare halal food for his Muslim soldiers from Akbart Horse Cavalry, Wali Khan Horse Cavalry, Manipur Horse Cavalry and Sar Tho Horse Cavalry, altogether about 700 of them.

U Soe was the royal tailor of King Mindon.

Kabul Maulavi was appointed an Islamic judge by King Mindon to decide according to the Islamic rules and customs on Muslim affairs.

Captain Min Htin Min Yazar's 400 Muslims participated to clear the land for building a new Mandalay city.

Burmese Muslims were given specific quarters to settle in the new city of Mandalay
 Sigaing dan
 Kone Yoe dan
 Taung Balu
 Oh Bo
 Setkyer Ngwezin
 June Amoke Tan
 Wali Khan Quarter
 Taik Tan Qr
 Koyandaw Qr (Royal Bodyguards' Qr)
 Ah Choke Tan
 Kala Pyo Qr
 Panthay dan for the Burmese Chinese Muslims.

In those quarters, lands for 20 Mosques were allocated outside the Palace wall. 
 Sigaing dan Mosque
 Kone Yoe Mosque
 Taung Balu Mosque
 June Mosque
 Koyandaw Mosque
 Wali Khan Mosque
 Kala Pyo Mosque
 Seven lots of lands for Setkyer Ngwezin
 King Mindon donated his palace teak pillars to build a mosque at North Obo in central Mandalay. (The pillars which failed to place properly at the exact time given by astrologers.)
 The broadminded King Mindon also permitted a mosque to be built on the granted site for the Panthays (Burmese Chinese Muslims). Photos of Mandalay Panthay mosque.

Inside the palace wall, for the royal bodyguards, King Mindon himself donated and started the building of the mosque by laying the gold foundation at the southeastern part of the palace located near the present Independent Monument. This mosque was called the Shwe Pannet Mosque. That mosque was demolished by in order to construct a polo playground for the Anglo-Burman community.

King Mindon (1853–78) donated the rest house in Mecca for his Muslim subjects performing Hajj. Nay Myo Gonna Khalifa U Pho Mya and Haji U Swe Baw were ordered to supervise the building. The king donated the balance needed to complete the building which was started with the donations from the Burmese Muslims. This was recorded in the Myaedu Mosque Imam U Shwe Taung's poems.

During King Thibaw's reign, Muslim soldiers who participated in the Royal Parade were;
 Captain Bo Min Htin Kyaw and his 350 Kindar Kala Pyo artillery soldiers.
 Setkyer Cannon Regiment Captain Hashim and 113 Cannoners
 Mingalar Cannon Regiment Captain U Kye and 113 Cannoners
 Mingalar Amyoke Sulay Kone Captain U Maung and 113 Cannoners
 Mingalar Amyoke Bone Oh Captain U Yauk and 113 Cannoners.

After King Thibaw's declaration of war on the British, the Burmese Army formed into three army groups in order to counter British offensives. One of those, Taung Twingyi defence chief was Akhbat Horse Cavalry Chief, Mayor of Pin Lae Town, Minister Maha Min Htin Yar Zar. His name was U Chone when he was the Chief Clerk of Kala Pyo Army. During the Myin Kun Myin Khone Tain revolt, he carried the chief queen of Mindon on his back to safety. So he was rewarded with the Mayor position of Pin Lae Myo which was located 12 miles south of Myittha.

Under Maha Min Htin Yar Zar there were 1629 soldiers:
 Kindar Captain Bo Min Hla Min Htin Kyaw Thu's 335 Kindar soldiers two cannon and Sein let Yae 3 regiments
 Shwe Pyi Captain Bo Min Hla Min Htin Thamain Than Like and Shwe Pyi 100 soldiers, one cannon and Sein let Yae 2 regiments
 Wali Khan's 990 Akhbat Horse Cavalry and Sein let Yae 20 regiments
 Specially trained 200 soldiers.

On 28 November 1885, after the British took over the administration, the British revamped the new administration with Kin Won Min Gyi, Tai Tar Min Gyi, the Minister Maha Min Htin Yar Zar U Chone was included as the representative of the Parliament.

Imprisonment of the last Mughal Emperor

The last Mughal Emperor Bahadur Shah II and his family members and some followers were exiled to Yangon, Myanmar. He died during his imprisonment in Yangon and was buried on 7 November 1862.

After the British took over the whole Burma all sub groups of Burmese-Muslims formed numerous organisations, active in social welfare and religious affairs.

Demographics

Islam, mainly of the Sunni denomination, is practised by 2.1% of the population of Burma according to the government census latest 2014 year. However, according to the US State Department's 2006 international religious freedom report, the country's non-Buddhist populations were underestimated in the census. Muslim leaders estimate that 10% of the population may be Muslim.

Various groups of Burmese Muslims
 Kamein, a government-recognized ethnic minority native to Rakhine state and one of the seven groups of the Rakhine nation.
 Indian-descended Muslim community of Rangoon. 
 Rohingyas, a minority Muslim ethnic group in northern Rakhine State, Myanmar. The Rohingya population is mostly concentrated in five northern townships of Rakhine State: Maungdaw, Buthidaung, Rathedaung, Akyab, Sandway, Tongo, Shokepro, Rashong Island and Kyauktaw.
 Panthay, Chinese Muslims in Burma migrated from Yunnan Province of China. 
 Burmese Malays in Kawthaung. Burmese people of Malay ancestry are locally called Pashu regardless of religion.
 Bamar Muslims (historically known as Zerbadi Muslims) are a community descended from inter-ethnic marriages between Indian Muslim males and Burmese females. They are the largest Muslim group in Myanmar and form more than half of the total Muslim population in the country. Culturally, Bamar Muslims are the same as the Bamar Buddhists including their lifestyle, clothing and language.

Religion and society

Official policy
The stated official policy of the government of Burma is that all ethnic, religious, and language groups in Burma are equal. The Lordship of the Supreme Court of Rangoon remarked:
"Today, in the various parts of Burma, there are people who, because of the origin and the isolated way of life, are totally unlike the Burmese in appearance of speak of events which had occurred outside the limits of their habitation. They are nevertheless statutory citizens under the Union (of Burma) Citizenship Act..... Thus mere race or appearance of a person or whether he has a knowledge of any language of the Union is not the test as to whether he is a citizen of the Union". Additionally, in 2005, the Ministry of Religious Affairs issued a declaration concerning freedom of religion:
All ethnic groups in Myanmar have been throughout the country since time immemorial. They have been living united in peace and harmony since the time of ancient Myanmar kings. Myanmar kings, in return, looked after the members of other Religious faiths by kindly giving them religious, social and economic opportunities equal to those awarded to Buddhists. It is well known that, to enable his Majesty's royal servants to fulfill their religious duties, Rakhine frame Mosque, Half-broken Mosque, Panthe Mosque, Mandalay Battery Ward Mosque and Christian Churches were allowed to be built and to perform respective religious duties during successive Myanmar kings. The Patron of the Fifth Buddhist Synod, King Mindone (1854 to 1878), during his rule built Peacock rest house in the Holy City of Mecca, for the Muslims from Myanmar who went there on Hajj pilgrimage to stay comfortably while they were there for about one and a half months. That act was one of the best testimonies in Myanmar history of how Myanmar kings looked after their Muslim subjects benevolently. Since the time of ancient Myanmar kings until the present day, successive Myanmar governments have given all four major religions an equal treatment. All the followers of each religion have been allowed to profess their respective religious faith and perform their respective duties freely. Myanmar's culture is based on loving kindness; the followers of Islam, Christianity and Hinduism in Myanmar are also kind-hearted people as Myanmar Buddhists are.

Persecution

The first instance of persecution that can be shown to have resulted from religious reasons occurred during the reign of King Bayinnaung, 1550-1589 AD. After conquering Bago in 1559, he prohibited the practice of halal, specifically, killing food animals in the name of God. He was religiously intolerant, forcing some of his subjects to listen to Buddhist sermons, possibly converting by force. He also disallowed the official Islamic feast Eid al-Adha, which is associated with the sacrifice of cattle. In Buddhism the killing of animals is regarded as a cruel practice and the Buddha preached ahimsa or non-violence. The halal practice was also forbidden by King Alaungpaya in the 18th century.

King Bodawpaya (1782–1819) arrested four famous Myanmar Muslims Moulvis (Imams) from Myedu and killed them in Ava, the capital, after they refused to eat pork. According to the Myedu Muslims and Burmese Muslims version there were seven dark days after that execution and the king later apologised and recognised them as saints.

Religious and race riots
Under the British rule, economic pressures and Burmese xenophobia contributed to the rise of anti-Indian, and later anti-Muslim sentiment. Following an anti-Indian riot in 1930, racial tensions flared between the ethnic Burmese and Indian immigrants. Burmese sentiment turned against those viewed as foreigners, including Muslims of all ethnic groups. Following this, an anti-Muslim riot occurred in 1938, strongly influenced by newspapers.

Burma for Burmese Campaign
These events led to the creation of the Burma for Burmese only Campaign, which staged a march to a Muslim Bazaar. While the Indian police broke the violent demonstration, three monks were hurt. Burmese newspapers used the pictures of Indian police attacking the Buddhist monks to further incite the spread of riots. Muslim shops, houses, and mosques were looted, destroyed, or burnt to ashes. Muslims were also assaulted and killed. The violence spread throughout Burma, with a total of 113 mosques damaged.

Inquiry Committee by British
On 22 September 1938, the British Governor set up the Inquiry Committee. This committee determined that the real cause of the discontent toward the government was deterioration of socio-political and economic conditions in Burma. This report was also used by Burmese newspapers to incite hatred against the British, Indians, and Muslims. The Simon Commission, which had been established to inquire into the effects of the Dyarchy system of ruling India and Burma in 1927, recommended that special places be assigned to the Burmese Muslims in the Legislative Council. It also recommended that full rights of citizenship should be guaranteed to all minorities: the right of free worship, the right to follow their own customs, the right to own property and to receive a share of the public revenues for the maintenance of their own educational and charitable institutions. It further recommended Home Rule or independent government separate from India or the status of dominion.

Japanese persecution of Muslims
Panglong, a Chinese Muslim town in British Burma, was entirely destroyed by the Japanese invaders in the Japanese invasion of Burma. The Hui Muslim Ma Guanggui became the leader of the Hui Panglong self-defense guard created by Su who was sent by the Kuomintang government of the Republic of China to fight against the Japanese invasion of Panglong in 1942. The Japanese destroyed Panglong, burning it and driving out the over 200 Hui households out as refugees. Yunnan and Kokang received Hui refugees from Panglong driven out by the Japanese. One of Ma Guanggui's nephews was Ma Yeye, a son of Ma Guanghua and he narrated the history of Panglang included the Japanese attack. An account of the Japanese attack on the Hui in Panglong was written and published in 1998 by a Hui from Panglong called "Panglong Booklet". The Japanese attack in Burma caused the Hui Mu family to seek refuge in Panglong but they were driven out again to Yunnan from Panglong when the Japanese attacked Panglong.

Anti-Fascist People's Freedom League
The BMC, Burma Muslim Congress was founded almost at the same time as the AFPFL, Anti-Fascist People's Freedom League of General Aung San and U Nu before World War Two. U Nu became the first Prime Minister of Burma in 1948, following Burmese independence. Shortly after, he requested that the Burma Muslim Congress resign its membership from AFPFL. In response, U Khin Maung Lat, the new President of BMC, decided to discontinue the religious practices of the BMC and rejoin the AFPFL. U Nu asked the BMC to dissolve in 1955, and removed it from AFPFL on 30 September 1956. Later U Nu decreed Buddhism as the state religion of Burma, angering religious minorities. He was then sued by U Than Tin and his comrades. Burma was never claimed as the land for Buddhism.

Ne Win's coup d'état
After the coup d'état of General Ne Win in 1962, the status of Muslims changed for the worse.

In that year, General Ne Win immediately reduced the Haj quota for Muslims to 102 persons only in the whole country. From next year, since 1963, he totally prohibited Muslims from performing Haj. After 17 years of total denial of Haj pilgrimage, only in 1980, open back that blockage and allowed 150 Muslims to perform Haj.
Only in 2005 his successor military coup junta, SPDC or The State Peace and Development Council increase the quota to 200 persons.
In 2017, during the NLD Government,7000 persons are allowed to perform Haj with the help of 50 Haj travel agents.

Muslims were expelled from the army and were rapidly marginalised. The generic racist slur of "kala" used against perceived "foreigners" gained especially negative connotations when referring to Burmese Muslims during this time. Accusations of "terrorism" were made against Muslim organisations such as the All Burma Muslim Union, (causing;) Muslims to join armed resistance groups to fight for greater freedoms.

Riots in Mandalay (1997)
On 16 March 1997 beginning at about 3:30 p.m., following reports of an attempted rape by Muslim men, a mob of about 1,000-1,500 Buddhist monks and others gathered in Mandalay. They targeted the mosques first for attack, followed by Muslim shop-houses and transportation vehicles in the vicinity of mosques. Looting, destruction of property, assault, and religious desecration all were reported. At least three people were killed and around 100 monks arrested.

Riots in Sittwe and Taungoo (2001)
Tension between Buddhists and Muslims was also high in Sittwe. The resentments are deeply rooted, and result from both communities feeling that they are under siege from the other. The violence in February 2001 flared up after an incident in which seven young Muslims refused to pay a Rakhine stall holder for cakes they had just eaten. The Rakhine seller, a woman, retaliated by beating one of the Muslims, according to a Muslim witness. He attested that several Muslims then came to protest and a brawl ensued. One monk nearby tried to solve that problem but was hit over the head by the angry Muslim men and started to bleed and killed. Riots then broke out. A full-scale riot erupted after dusk and carried on for several hours. Buddhists poured gasoline on Muslim homes and properties and set them alight. Four homes and a Muslim guest house were burned down. Police and soldiers reportedly stood by and did nothing to stop the violence initially. There are no reliable estimates of the death toll or the number of injuries. No one died according to some Muslim activists but one monk was killed. The fighting took place in the predominantly Muslim part of town and so it was predominantly Muslim property that was damaged.

In 2001,Myo Pyauk Hmar Soe Kyauk Hla Tai , The Fear of Losing One's Race, and many other anti-Muslim pamphlets were widely distributed by monks. Distribution of the pamphlets was also facilitated by the Union Solidarity and Development Association (USDA), a civilian organisation instituted by the ruling junta, the State Peace and Development Council (SPDC). Many Muslims feel that this exacerbated the anti-Muslim feelings that had been provoked by the destruction of the Buddhas of Bamiyan in the Bamyan Province of Afghanistan. Human Rights Watch reports that there was mounting tension between the Buddhist and Muslim communities in Taungoo for weeks before it erupted into violence in the middle of May 2001. Buddhist monks demanded that the Hantha Mosque in Taungoo be destroyed in "retaliation" for the destruction of the Buddhas of Bamiyan. Mobs of Buddhists, led by monks, vandalised Muslim-owned businesses and property and attacked and killed Muslims in Muslim communities. On 15 May 2001, anti-Muslim riots broke out in Taungoo, Bago division, resulting in the deaths of about 200 Muslims, in the destruction of 11 mosques, and setting ablaze of over 400 houses. On this day also, about 20 Muslims praying in the Han Tha mosque were beaten, some to death, by the pro-junta forces. On 17 May 2001, Lt. General Win Myint, Secretary No. 3 of the SPDC and deputy Home and Religious minister arrived and curfew was imposed there in Taungoo. All communication lines were disconnected. On 18 May, the Han Tha mosque and Taungoo Railway station mosque were razed by bulldozers owned by the SPDC. The mosques in Taungoo remained closed until May 2002, with Muslims forced to worship in their homes. After two days of violence the military stepped in and the violence immediately ended. There also were reports that local government authorities alerted Muslim elders in advance of the attacks and warned them not to retaliate to avoid escalating the violence. While the details of how the attacks began and who carried them out were unclear by year's end, the violence significantly heightened tensions between the Buddhist and Muslim communities.

Riots in Rakhine (2012)

In June 2012, violence erupted in western Burma's Arakan State between ethnic Rakhine (Arakan) and Rohingya. The violence broke out after reports circulated that on 28 May an Arakan woman was raped and killed in the town of Ramri allegedly by three Rohingya men. Details of the crime were circulated locally in an incendiary pamphlet, and on 3 June, a group of Arakan villagers in Toungop stopped a bus and killed 10 Muslims on board.

On 8 June, thousands of Rohingya rioted in Maungdaw town after Friday prayers by leading Islamic leaders, destroying property and killing Arakan (Rakhine) residents. Sectarian violence then quickly swept through the Arakan State capital, Sittwe, and surrounding areas.

On 9 June, mobs from both communities soon stormed unsuspecting villages and neighbourhoods, killing residents and destroying homes, shops, and houses of worship. With little to no government security present to stop the violence, people armed themselves with swords, spears, sticks, iron rods, knives, and other basic weapons, taking the law into their own hands.

In the first week of June, based on these two incidents, riots broke out in Rakhine States where rioters torched and destroyed houses, shops and guest houses and committed killings. 77 persons – 31 Rakhinis and 46 Rohingyas – lost lives in the incidents. The injured from both sides accounted for around 100. A total of 4,800 houses were burnt out by both sides in anger.

As of 24 July, the Rakkhine State Government estimated that there are over 61,000 people accommodated in 58 camps in Maundaw and Sittwe townships. 77 people died - 31 Rakhine nationals and 46 Rohingyans and 109 injured from both sides, and 4822 houses, 17 mosques, 15 monasteries and 3 schools were burned and destroyed.

In November, the International Network of Engaged Buddhists released a statement calling for the conflict to be resolved and stating that more than 75,000 people had been displaced and impoverished.

Agents provocateurs 
While the idea of monks actually leading rioters may seem unusual, certain details make it less so. Burma's large and much feared military intelligence service, the Directorate of Defense Security Intelligence, is commonly believed to have agents working within the monk-hood. Human Rights Watch also reported that monks in the 2001 riots were carrying mobile phones, a luxury not readily available to the Burmese population, as very few without government connections can afford them. It is also reported that there was a clear split between monks who provoked violence and those who did not. It has been suggested by Human Rights Watch and others that these facts may reflect the presence of agents provocateur among the monks.

2013 riots 
 
Tensions between Muslim and Buddhist communities flared up to several violent riots across the country in 2013.

Mandalay riots (2014) 
Buddhists and Muslims clashed for three days in Mandalay in early 29 May 2014, after a tea shop owned by a Muslim man accused of raping a Buddhist woman was attacked by a mob. Organized gangs of several hundred people armed with knives, rods and firearms were reportedly involved in the subsequent violence, which resulted in a curfew being imposed across the city. Two people, a Buddhist and a Muslim were killed in the attacks, and 14 were injured.

Rohingya Genocide 

In late 2016, the Myanmar military forces and extremist Buddhists started a major crackdown on the Rohingya Muslims in the country's western region of Rakhine State. The crackdown was in response to attacks on border police camps by unidentified insurgents, and has resulted in wide-scale human rights violations at the hands of security forces, including extrajudicial killings, gang rapes, arsons, and other brutalities. The military crackdown on Rohingya people drew criticism from various quarters including the United Nations, human rights group Amnesty International, the US Department of State, and the government of Malaysia. The de facto head of government Aung San Suu Kyi has particularly been criticized for her inaction and silence over the issue and for not doing much to prevent military abuses.

See also 

 2012 Ramu violence
 969 Movement
 Burmese Chinese
 Burmese Indians
 Burmese Malays
 Chakma people
 Jumma people
 List of Burmese Muslims
 List of Masjids in Mandalay
 Pakistanis in Burma
 Panthays (Burmese Chinese Muslims)
 Rohingya people
 Religion in Myanmar
 Rohingya insurgency in Western Myanmar
 2016–17 Northern Rakhine State clashes
 Terrorism in Burma

References

Bibliography

Further reading
 
 The Burmanization of Myanmar's Muslims, the acculturation of the Muslims in Burma including Arakan, Jean A. Berlie, White Lotus Press editor, Bangkok, Thailand, published in 2008. , .
 
 
 
 
 
 
 
 
 
 
 
 
 
 
 
 
 N. Kamal. Building confidence in Rohingyas' mind. The New Nation Newspaper, Dhaka, Bangladesh, 26 April 1992.

External links

 Situation of Muslims in Burma
 US Department of State, International Religious Freedom Report 2005 on Burma